Henri-Louis Blanchard (7 February 1778 – 18 December 1858) was a French playwright, composer, violinist and music critic.

Biography 
The son of a violinist, he studied with Franz Beck in Bordeaux, Rodolphe Kreutzer, Méhul and Reicha at the Conservatoire de Paris. As soon as 1836, he participated, among numerous publications, at the Revue et gazette musicale de Paris in which he published his essais biographiques  until 1856

Conductor of the Théâtre des Variétés from 1824 to 1829, he took part as librettist to some plays presented at the Théâtre-Français and also composed for the Théâtre du Gymnase or the Théâtre du Vaudeville more than three hundred melodies. He also put into music most of the texts by the poet Béranger He also wrote romances, canons for four, six and eight voices, duets for violin, viola quartets, concertos, a fugue for three violins, a fantasy for harp and violin etc.

In 1830 he became managing director of the Théâtre de Molière, a position he would keep until he died in 1858.

Works 
1812: Le Soleil, romance
1812: La Lune, romance
1816: Clarisse et Lovelace, ou Le suborneur, pantomime in three acts, mixed with dialogue, after Samuel Richardson
1828: Galopade hongroise..., arranged for the piano
1830: Couplets chantés au banquet de l'artillerie de la Garde nationale, le 10 décembre 1830, lyrics and music
1831: Don Pedro, roi du Portugal, melodrama in three acts and four tableaux, by Jules-Édouard Alboize de Pujol, music
1831: Diana Vernon, comédie-vaudeville en 1 acte by Adolphe de Leuven and Auguste Pittaud de Forges, music
1831: Camille Desmoulins, ou Les partis en 1794, historical drama in five acts, with Julien de Mallian
1831: Henri-Montan Berton, membre de l'Institut

Bibliography 
 Joseph Marie Quérard, Félix Bourquelot, Charles Louandre, La littérature française contemporaine. XIXe siècle, 1842, p. 574-578 (Lire en ligne) 
 Camille Dreyfus, André Berthelot, La Grande encyclopédie: inventaire raisonné des sciences, 1886, p. 1012
 Revue de Musicologie, 1967, p. 81
 Marie-Noëlle Colette, La Musique à Paris en 1830-1831: enquête, 1983, p. 88
 Paul Mironneau, Chansonnier Henri IV, Ed. du pin à crochets, 1999, p. 84
 Zdenko Silvela, A New History of Violin Playing, 2001, p. 312

References 

19th-century French dramatists and playwrights
French classical composers
French male classical composers
19th-century French male classical violinists
French music critics
Writers from Bordeaux
1778 births
1858 deaths
19th-century classical composers
19th-century French composers
French male dramatists and playwrights
19th-century French male writers
French male non-fiction writers
Musicians from Bordeaux